Bill Lawry... This is Your Life is the fifth album released by The Twelfth Man. Released on 7 December 1997, it reached number one on the ARIA Album Charts for two weeks. The album contains special guest vocals from Jimmy Barnes, John Farnham, and Merv Hughes.

At the ARIA Music Awards of 1998, the album was nominated for ARIA Award for Best Comedy Release losing to Paul McDermott's Unplugged Good News Week Tapes: Volume 1.

Plot
An episode of This Is Your Life is aired about Bill Lawry, with many of Bill's friends and rivals making appearances. There is a running gag throughout that Richie is none too impressed by Bill receiving an episode of This Is Your Life before him and not inviting him to a party in the city. Another running gag is Bill Lawry repeatedly calling host Mike Munro, Matt Munro.

Track listing 
CD (4934352)
 "What's on the Box" – 1:11
 "Bill's Surprise" – 3:32
 ""..You Were Born..." / The Doctor / The School Master" – 8:29
 "Blind Love / The Wife / The Pigeons / The School Chum / Ratings-winning Guest #1" – 7:59
 "Bill's Early Careers / Richie / 'The Don' / Ratings-winning Guest #2" – 8:25
 "Peter Pollock / The Nawab / Geoff Boycott / The Fan Club" – 7:40
 "Bill Hangs Up His Boots / Chappelli And Maxy / Tony / The Hero" – 12:27

Charts

Weekly charts

Year-end charts

Certifications

See also
 List of number-one albums of 1997 (Australia)
 List of number-one albums of 1998 (Australia)
 List of Top 25 albums for 1997 in Australia

References

1997 albums
Cricket on the radio
The Twelfth Man albums
1990s comedy albums